Kokkini is a village in the central part of the island of Corfu, Greece. It was the municipal seat of Parelioi. In 2011 its population was 580. The village is situated on a low hill, between forests and farmlands.

Population

See also

List of settlements in the Corfu regional unit

References

External links
 Kokkini at the GTP Travel Pages

Populated places in Corfu (regional unit)